New Zealand at the 1934 British Empire Games was represented by a small team of 12 competitors and one official. Team selection for the Games in London, England, was the responsibility of the New Zealand Olympic and British Empire Games Association. New Zealand's flagbearer at the opening ceremony was Jack Lovelock.

New Zealand has competed in every games, starting with the previous (and first) British Empire Games in 1930 at Hamilton, Ontario.

Medal tables

Competitors
The following table lists the number of New Zealand competitors participating at the Games per sport/discipline.

Athletics

Track

Field

Cycling

Lawn bowls

Swimming

Officials
 Team manager – Arthur Porritt

See also
New Zealand Olympic Committee
New Zealand at the Commonwealth Games
New Zealand at the 1932 Summer Olympics
New Zealand at the 1936 Summer Olympics

External links
NZOC website on the 1934 games
Commonwealth Games Federation website
Athletes in the Encyclopaedia of New Zealand has a paragraph on these Games

1934
British Empire Games
Nations at the 1934 British Empire Games